Abbots Pond is a settlement in Newfoundland and Labrador.
Abbots pond is known for its Brook Trout And local Fishers, Abbots pond is located on the island of Newfoundland, closer to the east this pond is mainly warmer in the summers compared to the capital city of St. John's.  

Populated places in Newfoundland and Labrador